Per Fossum (July 27, 1910 – December 24, 2004) was a Norwegian alpine skier who competed in the 1936 Winter Olympics, when he finished ninth in the alpine skiing combined event.

External links
 Alpine skiing 1936 

1910 births
2004 deaths
Norwegian male alpine skiers
Olympic alpine skiers of Norway
Alpine skiers at the 1936 Winter Olympics